Goiyanar is a small village in Siwan. It is one of 45,103 villages of the Bihar in  North-Eastern India.It comes under Mirjumla Panchayat. It belongs to Saran division . It is located 35 km towards East from District headquarters Siwan. 9 km from Bhagwanpur Hat and 86 km from State capital Patna.This Place is in the border of the Siwan District and Saran District.

How to reach Goiyanar 
 By road 
Maharajganj, Siwan , Chhapra are the nearby by towns to Goiyanar having road connectivity to Goiyanar

Nearest airport
Jay Prakash Narayan International Airport , Patna about 94.4 km

Nearest railway station 
Ekma railway station about 15 km

References

Villages in Siwan district